A statue of John Mason is installed in Windsor, Connecticut, United States. The memorial is slated for removal, as of July 2020. As of January 2021, it has yet to be removed.  Sculptor was James G. C. Hamilton.

See also

 List of monuments and memorials removed during the George Floyd protests

References

External links
 

Monuments and memorials in Connecticut
Outdoor sculptures in Connecticut
Sculptures of men in Connecticut
Statues in Connecticut